Faiyaz Ahmad is an Indian politician belonging to Rashtriya Janata Dal, he is a member of the Rajya Sabha from Bihar since May 2022. He had been elected two consecutive terms as a Member of Bihar Legislative Assembly from Bisfi 2010 and 2015. He is an educationist and founder of Madhubani Medical College and Hospital. The Rashtriya Janata Dal (RJD) announced Faiyaz Ahmad as the party's candidate for the upcoming Rajya Sabha elections.

References

External links 
 Faiyaz Ahmad on Facebook

Living people
Rashtriya Janata Dal politicians
Year of birth missing (living people)
Bihar MLAs 2010–2015
Bihar MLAs 2015–2020